Ferenc Kiss is the name of:

 Ferenc Kiss (actor) (1892–1973), Hungarian actor
 Ferenc Kiss (athlete) (born 1955), Hungarian sprinter
 Ferenc Kiss (rower) (born 1956), Hungarian rower
 Ferenc Kiss (wrestler) (1942–2015), Hungarian wrestler